Shane Murphy (born 19 August 1983 in Glounthaune, County Cork, Ireland) is an Irish hurler. He plays hurling with his local club Erin's Own and is a substitute Right Corner Back for the Cork Inter-County Team. He made his debut for Cork in 2007 in a game against Waterford.

Honours
Cork Senior Hurling Championships: 2
 2006, 2007
Cork Under-21 Hurling Championships: 2
 2002, 2004
All-Ireland Minor Hurling Championships: 1
 2001

References

1983 births
Living people
Cork inter-county hurlers
Erin's Own (Cork) hurlers